The Puente Colgante, originally called Puente de Clavería, was a suspension bridge that connected the Manila districts of Quiapo and Ermita across the Pasig River in the Philippines.  Designed by Matia, Menchacatorre and Cía., completed in 1852, it was the first suspension bridge in Asia and the first toll bridge of its kind in the Philippines. It was replaced by Quezon Bridge in 1939.

History
Puente Colgante (which is the term for a suspension bridge in Spanish; literally, hanging bridge), the second bridge built over Pasig river, was the first suspension bridge built in Asia when it was completed in 1852. It was built and owned by Ynchausti y Compañia, the business headed by Jose Joaquín de Ynchausti.  He commissioned the wire-cable suspension design from Spanish-Basque engineer Matias Menchacatorre. The bridge was first named Puente de Clavería, likely in honor of the Governor-General of the Philippines Narciso Clavería, who served from 1844 to 1849.

It was also opened for pedestrians traveling on foot between Quiapo and Intramuros and nearby areas.

In 1854, Ynchausti brought together the Ynchausti family holdings under the above name.  A Basque Spaniard born in Cadiz, de Ynchausti migrated to the Philippines in the second quarter of the nineteenth century and built a business empire. In 1889, Ynchausti y Compañia was the largest company in the Philippines.

Ynchausti y Cia were originally granted a franchise to operate the bridge as a toll bridge for 90 years. Tolls were subsequently abolished on June 15, 1911. Carromata traffic was prohibited after inspection of the bridge deemed such traffic unsafe. Automobile traffic was never permitted.

The 20th-century Filipino writer Nick Joaquin described the bridge as it was in the 1870s: “Across the city’s river now arched … the amazing Puente Colgante, suspended in the air, like a salute to the age of science and engineering. The Industrial Age found its expression in the Philippines in the form of a bridge unparalleled throughout Asia.”
Historians dispute local traditions that say the bridge was designed by Gustave Eiffel, who designed the Eiffel Tower in Paris. (This is also asserted about the Puente de Ayala.) They note the original bridge has been documented as designed by a Basque. (In addition, the 1930s work was performed a decade after Eiffel died in 1923.)

Puente Colgante was later replaced by Quezon Bridge in 1939.

References 

Former buildings and structures in Manila
Bridges in Manila
Suspension bridges
History of the Philippines (1565–1898)
Spanish colonial infrastructure in the Philippines
Former toll bridges